Alpha Sigma Tau (known as  or Alpha Tau) is a national sorority founded on November 4, 1899, at Eastern Michigan University (formerly Michigan State Normal College). A member of the National Panhellenic Conference, the sorority has 78 active collegiate chapters at colleges and universities around the U.S. and over 65,000+ lifetime members.

History 
On November 4, 1899, eight women founded Alpha Sigma Tau's first chapter at Michigan State Normal College (now Eastern Michigan University). Founders were: 
Helene M. Rice 
Adriance Rice
Mayene Tracy
Eva O’Keefe
May Gephart
Mabel Chase
Ruth Dutcher
Harriet Marx. 
The name "Alpha Sigma Tau" was chosen, and emerald green and gold were chosen for the colors. Alpha Sigma Tau was initially founded as an educational sorority. There were three other sororities at Michigan State Normal College at the time: Pi Kappa Sigma (merged into Sigma Kappa), Sigma Nu Phi (local), and Zeta Phi (local, inactive).

Effie E. Polyhamus Lyman was chosen as patroness. During the first year of its existence, the sorority did not display marked activity. The charter was  received the following year, as Edith Silk, Myrtle Oram, Zoe Waldron, Grace Townley, Marie Gedding, Louise Agrell, and Mable Pitts had joined the organization and were the charter members. By suggestion of Mrs. Effie E. Polyhamus Lyman, Ms. Abigail Pearce and Ms. Ada A. Norton were asked to be patronesses.

The Beta chapter was founded in 1905 at Central Michigan University (formerly Central Michigan Normal College) in Mt. Pleasant, Michigan.

Now at more than one institution, Alpha Sigma Tau leaders desired to grow the sorority and become recognized as a national group. In order to be recognized as a national organization by the Association of Education Sororities (AES), a national organization for sororities at teachers colleges; Alpha Sigma Tau had to meet certain requirements:

 Hold a National Convention
 Have five active chapters
 Publish a magazine

These requirements were met in 1925: Alpha Sigma Tau held its inaugural Convention in Detroit, Michigan; the first issue of the Sorority's magazine, The Anchor, was published; five active chapters was fulfilled the Sigma chapter at Buffalo State College was installed. In 1926, Alpha Sigma Tau became an initiated member the Association of Education Sororities (AES).

In December 1951, AES merged with the National Panhellenic Conference (NPC). This merger permitted Alpha Sigma Tau to begin establishing chapters at any accredited school and admit members regardless of major.

 Cynthia Peckhart McCrory is the only Alpha Sigma Tau member to have served as Chair of the National Panhellenic Conference. McCrory served as NPC Chair from 1983 to 1985.

Symbols & Insignia 
Alpha Sigma Tau's colors are emerald green and gold. Its flower is the yellow rose, its jewel is the pearl, and its symbol is the anchor. Alpha Sigma Tau is nicknamed "Alpha Tau".

Sorority Badge 
The badge is a black, kite-like polygon with a golden  inscribed on the enamel, bordered by gold, inlaid with small pearls. Members with different roles may order badges with different jewels on the badge's four points: volunteers have rubies, advisors have rubies or amethysts, yellow topaz identifies NPC delegates, and emerald identifies National Council members and National Officers, while the badge used by all past and current National Presidents has a double border of gold inlaid with diamonds.

Sorority Crest 
The crest of the Sorority, which was designed by Ruth Magers Glosser in 1922, is made of symbols important to the organization and members: an open book, a crown, six stars, and an anchor (counterclockwise starting from top right). A candle with glowing rays is above the shield, and a banner with "Alpha Sigma Tau" written in Greek (ΑλΦα ΣΙλμα Ταυ) is below. This crest is to be worn by initiated members only.

Values 
Alpha Sigma Tau emphasizes five core values that all members should uphold and abide by.

 Graciousness – Embody kindness, generosity of spirit, charm, tact, courtesy, and authenticity in all.
 Respect – The highest level of esteem for the worth of oneself, Sisters, Ritual, and community.
 Intellect – The pursuit and cultivation of knowledge, wisdom, and culture.
 Connections – Build and maintain meaningful, sincere, and lasting relationships with Sisters, alma mater, and the community.
 Excellence – Always seek to perform at the highest level; have a disdain for mediocrity; create and take advantage of opportunities to excel.

Creed 
The Sorority adopted its Creed in October 1944 As a member of Alpha Sigma Tau,
I believe in the permanence and loveliness of its ideals.
I believe in the values of friendship and fidelity to purpose.
I believe in the fulfillment of self and will strive to contribute my share to the progress of humankind.
I believe in cultivating beauty of spirit and graciousness of living in all my contacts with others.
I believe that faithfulness to these ideals will help me to live joyously and valiantly. The Creed was created at a National Council meeting to embody the beliefs of the Sorority. Each member on the committee was charged with creating the Creed, contributing a portion of this Sorority cornerstone known today. Contributions were made by: 3rd National President Carrie Washburne Staehle (Alpha 1924/Eastern Michigan), Beverly Bollard (Sigma 1932/Buffalo State), Mary Alice Seller Peterson (Iota*/Emporia State), and Ruth Maher (Pi 1938/Harris-Stowe).

In June 2021, the National Council revised the Creed to state: “…contribute my share to the progress of humankind.” This modernization, revising the term mankind to be humankind, better captures the spirit of the Sorority members’ commitment to enriching the lives of those around them. Reasoning that the intended sentiment of this line is that members of Alpha Sigma Tau play an active role in elevating humanity and making the world a better place for all. The exclusivity of the gendered term “mankind” not only doesn't represent the sorority membership base of women, but it also overshadows the key message of contributing positively to all of humanity.

Collegiate Membership Experience

Invitation 
Alpha Sigma Tau Sorority is a private membership organization. For membership selection purposes, only women who meet and maintain the requirements and obligations as set forth by the Sorority shall be eligible for membership invitation.

Legacy 
During the structured recruitment process, any woman who is related to a member of Alpha Sigma Tau is known as a Legacy. Alpha Sigma Tau defines a Legacy as someone who has a blood or step-relative in the Sorority. Potential new members will indicate this special status during the recruitment process and notify the chapter. In addition to notifying the chapter, it is encouraged to have a written recommendation from the relative.

Academics 
Invitations to new members are extended based partially on academic success. Each potential new member must have a minimum 2.5 GPA before a chapter can consider her for membership. Current members are expected to maintain at least a 2.5 GPA, though ΑΣΤ chapters are encouraged to have a higher minimum requirement to maintain the average national GPA. The average national GPA is above a 3.0.GPA

Each collegiate chapter has a Director of Academic Success whose primary responsibility is to ensure members are reaching their fullest potential in their coursework. Additionally, members are encouraged to support one another academically. Upperclassmen members offer advice and guidance to freshmen and sophomores, while the built-in social network of sorority life also provides study partners.

Annually, members are eligible to apply for $65,000 in scholarship support. These scholarships are exclusive to members of ΑΣΤ and made possible by donors to the Alpha Sigma Tau Foundation.

Philanthropy 
The National Philanthropy of Alpha Sigma Tau Sorority is the Women's Wellness Initiative. As a Sisterhood, Alpha Sigma Tau contributes to helping all women become the best versions of themselves. Alpha Sigma Tau believes that women who achieve and maintain wellness are more likely to reach their fullest potential.

Women's Wellness Initiative 
The Women’s Wellness Initiative is grounded in the Six Dimensions of Wellness of the National Wellness Institute – a nationally recognized leader in promoting optimal health and wellness in individuals and communities. These dimensions are the result of decades of research, which shows that individuals who achieve and maintain wellness are considerably more likely to lead successful, fulfilling lives. The Six Dimensions of Wellness are:

 Occupational 
 Physical
 Spiritual
 Emotional
 Intellectual 
 Social

Through the Women's Wellness Initiative, Alpha Sigma Tau has established relationships with National Service Partners who believe in empowering women and girls in the communities throughout the U.S. Currently, Sorority partners include Dress for Success and Girls Who Code.

Dress for Success 
Dress for Success is an international nonprofit organization that empowers women to achieve economic independence by providing a network of support, professional attire, and the development tools to help women thrive in work and in life.

Girls Who Code 
Girls Who Code is an international nonprofit organization working to close the gender gap in technology. Girls Who Code programs inspire, educate, and equip girls with the computing skills they will need to pursue 21st-century opportunities.

The National Foundation 
The Alpha Sigma Tau Foundation was created in 1982 to give members a way to directly support the charitable and educational initiatives of the Sorority. The Foundation is solely funded by donor support and benefits members through grant funding and scholarship support. In February 2021, Alpha Sigma Tau Foundation distributed approximately $65,000 in scholarships to support members' educational pursuits. Additionally, grants from the Foundation to the Sorority support education and initiatives for members on:

 financial literacy
 leadership development
 safe decisions related to alcohol
 prescription drug abuse prevention
 sexual assault and relationship violence

Collegiate chapters

Alumnae Chapters and Associations 
Alpha Sigma Tau alumnae members can establish or join alumnae clubs known as alumnae chapters or alumnae associations. As of 2021, Alpha Sigma Tau has 32 established alumnae chapters or associations. The purpose of these groups is to provide women with a network of support. Alumnae chapters and associations host events, foster friendships, and support collegiate members.

Publications 
 The Anchor is the sorority's print magazine, published twice annually. Its articles pertain to Alpha Sigma Tau, fraternity/sorority life, and issues affecting women today. The Anchor was first published in 1925.
 Alpha Signal is a weekly electronic newsletter informing collegiate chapter officers and advisors of important Sorority news, programs, and updates.
 The Crest is a monthly e-newsletter featuring Sorority news and events sent to alumnae members.
 Connections is a monthly e-newsletter featuring Sorority news and events sent to collegiate members.
 The Foundation Circle is an e-newsletter delivered monthly to supporters of the Alpha Sigma Tau Foundation.

Notable Members 
Mildred Doran (Alpha) – aviator
Gwen Frostic (Alpha) – nature artist and environmentalist; Inducted into Michigan Women's Hall of Fame
Jessica Furrer (Upsilon) – Miss Arkansas USA 2005; Semi-finalist in Miss USA 2005
Terri Utley (Upsilon) – Miss Arkansas USA 1982; Winner of Miss USA 1982
Louise McNeill (Omicron) – American poet, essayist, and historian of Appalachia
Hannah Billingsley Mooney (Upsilon) – Miss Arkansas USA 2013
Colleen L. Jones-Cervantes (Beta Xi) – CEO Chevron Lubricants
Hayley Arceneaux (Phi) – physician assistant, Inspiration 4 crew member and Chief Medical Officer

National Presidents 

*The late Carrie Washburne Staehle and Lenore Seibel King have been recognized as Presidents Emerita.

National Headquarters 
The Headquarters building located in Indianapolis, Indiana, serves as an office for many Alpha Sigma Tau employees (known as Headquarters Staff) and archives for historical publications, photographs, documents, and keepsakes.

The original location of the National Headquarters was St. Louis, Missouri, adopted in 1949 by National President Dorothy Robinson. National Headquarters was relocated to Birmingham, Alabama, in 1994 for 16 years. In 2009, Alpha Sigma Tau moved its National Headquarters to Indianapolis, Indiana, the home of over 30 other fraternal organization headquarters.

See also 
List of social fraternities and sororities

References 

 
1899 establishments in Michigan
Fraternities and sororities based in Indianapolis
National Panhellenic Conference
Student organizations established in 1899
Sororities